Barnabé Messomo (born 26 August 1956) is a Cameroonian sprinter. He competed in the men's 100 metres at the 1984 Summer Olympics.

References

1956 births
Living people
Athletes (track and field) at the 1984 Summer Olympics
Cameroonian male sprinters
Olympic athletes of Cameroon
Place of birth missing (living people)